Juzefs Petkēvičs (born 19 December 1940, Riga) is a Latvian chess Grandmaster of Polish origin.

Born into a Polish family (his uncle was a Catholic bishop), he came first in the Riga Championship of 1967, winning all thirteen games.
He tied for 1st-3rd at Pärnu 1967. He thrice shared 1st in Latvian Chess Championship (1969, 1974, 1985).

Petkēvičs played for Latvia in Chess Olympiads:
 In 1994, at first reserve board in the 31st Chess Olympiad in Moscow (+1 –1 =4);
 In 1996, at second reserve board in the 32nd Chess Olympiad in Yerevan (+4 –1 =2);
 In 1998, at first reserve board in the 33rd Chess Olympiad in Elista (+2 –0 =3).

He won the 12th World Senior Chess Championship at Naumburg 2002.

Petkēvičs was awarded the International Master (IM) title in 1980, and the GM title in 2002.

References

External links

1940 births
Living people
Sportspeople from Riga
Chess grandmasters
World Senior Chess Champions
Polish chess players
Latvian chess players
Soviet chess players
Latvian people of Polish descent